The 1891 North-West Territories general election was held on 7 November 1891 to elect 25 members of the Legislative Assembly of the North-West Territories, Canada. It was the second general election in the History of the North-West Territories. The legislature for the first time had no appointed members.  It had 25 elected members, four more than in the 1888 election. The assembly had grown by one member -- the three appointed "at large" legal advisors who had sat in the assembly previously were no longer there. 

Frederick W. A. G. Haultain, the member for Macleod, was the government leader.

The key issue in this election was the French language question. Politicians had spent the previous three years divided on the issues of eliminating the status of the French language as an official language of the territory, and of assimilation of the French-speaking population. The appointed government made French an official language in Section 11 of the North-West Territories Act of 1877 that gained Royal Assent 28 April 1877. Prior to that, French was an official language while the North-West Territories was administered under the Manitoba Act from 1870 to 1875.

The issue was ignited by Lieutenant Governor Joseph Royal reading the Speech from the Throne in French on 31 October 1888. The outcry caused Royal to read his second throne speech in English only. On 28 October 1889, the issue was made dormant when a Record Division was taken on the "Language Resolution", a motion that stated the assembly did not need official recognition of languages. The vote was 17 for 2 against. But this did not last, because the federal government got involved, and warned the Lieutenant Governor Royal to start making speeches in French again, and tried to legislate official bilingualism back in the territory, through the House of Commons of Canada. The bill was defeated on second reading, however.

The interference by the Government of Canada resulted in members being elected to the assembly who favoured English as the only official language. On 19 January 1892 Haultain made a motion that only English would be used in the Assembly. The motion passed on division: 20 for, 4 against.

Electoral system
Most of the members were elected in single-member districts through First past the post.

In Calgary two members were elected, through Block Voting (although in this instance they were elected by acclamation).

Election results
The turnout can not be established as no voters lists were in use. 

Members were elected on non-partisan basis but decisions were decided by majority vote in the chamber. 

Note: No vote returns, are currently available from the Batoche, St. Albert and Souris districts

Results by riding 
Members elected to the 2nd North-West Legislative Assembly.
For complete electoral history, see individual districts

Notes

References

Further reading

External links
Personnel of the Northwest Territories Assembly 1888–1905
Justifying the End of Official Bilingualism in the Northwest Territories

Elections in the Northwest Territories
1891 elections in Canada
1891 in the Northwest Territories
November 1891 events